Tihawali

Tihawali village, Sikar District, Rajasthan State, PinCode 332307, Std. Code 01571
Located 16 km from Fatehpur Shekhawati and 6 km from Mandawa Nearby villages Sadinsar, Khalashi, Tihay, Bhakakrwashi, Nangali.

Villages in Sikar district